Xenoctenidae is a family of araneomorph spiders separated from Miturgidae in 2017.

Genera and species

, the World Spider Catalog accepts the following genera and species:

Incasoctenus Mello-Leitão, 1942
Incasoctenus perplexus Mello-Leitão, 1942 (type species) – Peru

Odo Keyserling, 1887
Odo abudi Alayón, 2002 – Hispaniola
Odo agilis Simon, 1897 – St. Thomas
Odo ariguanabo Alayón, 1995 – Cuba
Odo australiensis Hickman, 1944 – Central Australia
Odo blumenauensis Mello-Leitão, 1927 – Brazil
Odo bruchi (Mello-Leitão, 1938) – Argentina
Odo cubanus (Franganillo, 1946) – Cuba
Odo desenderi Baert, 2009 – Ecuador (Galapagos Is.)
Odo drescoi (Caporiacco, 1955) – Venezuela
Odo galapagoensis Banks, 1902 – Ecuador (Galapagos Is.)
Odo gigliolii Caporiacco, 1947 – Guyana
Odo incertus Caporiacco, 1955 – Venezuela
Odo insularis Banks, 1902 – Ecuador (Galapagos Is.)
Odo keyserlingi Kraus, 1955 – El Salvador
Odo lenis Keyserling, 1887 (type species) – Nicaragua
Odo limitatus Gertsch & Davis, 1940 – Mexico
Odo lycosoides (Chamberlin, 1916) – Peru
Odo maelfaiti Baert, 2009 – Ecuador (Galapagos Is.)
Odo obscurus Mello-Leitão, 1936 – Brazil
Odo patricius Simon, 1900 – Peru, Chile
Odo pulcher Keyserling, 1891 – Brazil
Odo roseus (Mello-Leitão, 1941) – Argentina
Odo sericeus (Mello-Leitão, 1944) – Argentina
Odo serrimanus Mello-Leitão, 1936 – Brazil
Odo similis Keyserling, 1891 – Brazil
Odo tulum Alayón, 2003 – Mexico
Odo vittatus (Mello-Leitão, 1936) – Brazil

Paravulsor Mello-Leitão, 1922
Paravulsor impudicus Mello-Leitão, 1922 (type species) – Brazil

Xenoctenus Mello-Leitão, 1938
Xenoctenus marmoratus Mello-Leitão, 1941 – Argentina
Xenoctenus pampeanus Mello-Leitão, 1940 – Argentina
Xenoctenus patagonicus Mello-Leitão, 1940 – Argentina
Xenoctenus unguiculatus Mello-Leitão, 1938 (type species) – Argentina

References

 
Araneomorphae families